Joe Dailey is a former American football coach who previously served as the offensive coordinator at Liberty, New Mexico, and recently wide receivers coach for the Carolina Panthers of the National Football League (NFL).

Raised in Freehold Township, New Jersey, Dailey played prep football at St. Peter's Preparatory School in Jersey City, New Jersey.

College career 
Dailey played quarterback for Nebraska and North Carolina, finishing his career with 3,458 yards and 26 touchdowns.

Coaching career

Buffalo 
Dailey began his coaching career as a graduate assistant at Buffalo for one season before being promoted to Tight Ends Coach his second season.

Kansas 
In 2010, Dailey served as a recruiting coordinator at Kansas.

Bethune-Cookman 
In 2011, Dailey was hired as the quarterbacks coach at Bethune-Cookman.

Liberty 
From 2012 to 2013 Dailey was the quarterbacks coach at Liberty before being promoted to offensive coordinator in 2014, a job he would hold through 2018.

New Mexico 
In 2019, Dailey was named the offensive coordinator of New Mexico.

Boston College 
From 2020 to 2021, Dailey was the wide receivers coach at Boston College.

Carolina Panthers 
On February 14, 2022 Dailey was hired by head coach Matt Rhule as the wide receivers coach of the Carolina Panthers.

References

External links 

 Carolina Panthers profile

Living people
American football quarterbacks
Carolina Panthers coaches
Liberty Flames football coaches
Boston College Eagles football coaches
People from Freehold Township, New Jersey
Players of American football from New Jersey
Coaches of American football from New Jersey
Sportspeople from Monmouth County, New Jersey
St. Peter's Preparatory School alumni
Nebraska Cornhuskers football players
North Carolina Tar Heels football players
Year of birth missing (living people)